Narendra Kumar Padarath is a Fiji Indian politician who won the Ba West Indian Communal Constituency for the Labour Party in 2006 general election.

He is the President of the Poultry Industry Association of Fiji.

References 

Fiji Labour Party politicians
Indian members of the House of Representatives (Fiji)
Living people
Politicians from Ba Province
Year of birth missing (living people)